Yussif Raman Chibsah (born 10 March 1993) is a Ghanaian professional footballer who plays as a midfielder for Super League Greece club Ionikos. He represented the Ghana national team.

Club career
On 17 August 2012, Chibsah moved from Juventus to Parma in a co-ownership deal (swap with Francesco Anacoura) before being immediately loaned to Sassuolo, where he was under contract prior to his move to Juventus in 2011 (having joined from Bechem United in March 2009). Both 50% registration rights of Anacoura and Chibsah were tagged for €750,000. Chibsah also received a call-up to Parma's pre-season camp on 14 July 2012.

On 1 September 2012, he made his professional debut for Sassuolo against Crotone as a substitute in a 2–1 victory in Serie B.

On 19 June 2013, Parma acquired the playing rights for Chibsah outright for €1 million and renewed the co-ownership of Anacoura. Sassuolo later acquired half of the registration rights of Chibsah from Parma for €2.5 million.

In June 2014 Sassuolo acquired playing rights for Chibsah and Nicola Sansone outright for an additional €5.75 million, and Pedro Filipe Mendes was bought back for €2.5 million.

On 6 July 2015, Chibsah joined newly promoted Serie A side Frosinone in a season-long loan move.

On 15 July 2016, he was signed by Serie B side Benevento on loan, winning the promotion playoffs to Serie A. Benevento also acquired Chibsah outright at the end of season. However, on 15 January 2018, Chibsah returned to Frosinone on loan. On 19 June, Chibsah joined Frosinone outright.

On 8 August 2019, Chibsah joined Turkish Süper Lig club Gazişehir Gaziantep. On 9 September 2020, Gazisehir Gaziantep announced they had parted ways with Chibsah following a mutual contract termination.

On 18 September 2020, he became a new VfL Bochum player.

On 2 February 2022, Chibsah signed with Apollon Smyrnis in Greece.

International career
Chibsah was born and raised in Ghana. He debuted for the Ghana U20s in 2013, for the senior team in a friendly 2–2 tie against Turkey in 2013, and for the Ghana U23 in a 1–0 loss to the Mozambique U23s.

Career statistics

Club

Honours 
Sassuolo
 Serie B: 2012–13

VfL Bochum
 2. Bundesliga: 2020–21

References

External links
 
 Lega Serie B profile 
 http://aic.football.it/scheda/26138/chibsah-yussif-raman.htm

Living people
1993 births
Footballers from Accra
Ghanaian footballers
Association football midfielders
Ghana international footballers
Ghana under-20 international footballers
Parma Calcio 1913 players
U.S. Sassuolo Calcio players
Frosinone Calcio players
Benevento Calcio players
Gaziantep F.K. footballers
VfL Bochum players
Apollon Smyrnis F.C. players
Serie A players
Serie B players
Süper Lig players
Ghanaian expatriate footballers
Ghanaian expatriate sportspeople in Italy
Expatriate footballers in Italy
Ghanaian expatriate sportspeople in Turkey
Expatriate footballers in Turkey
Ghanaian expatriate sportspeople in Germany
Expatriate footballers in Germany
Ghanaian expatriate sportspeople in Greece
Expatriate footballers in Greece